Harold Boyd may refer to:

 Harold Boyd (footballer, born 1900) (1900–1990), Australian rules footballer for West Perth
 Harold Boyd (footballer, born 1913) (1913–1971), Australian rules footballer for Fitzroy